The San Clemente-class oil tanker is a class of Oil tankers built by National Steel and Shipbuilding Company (NASSCO), San Diego. The size places them in the category of super tankers. They were built to serve the Trans-Alaska Pipeline System. At the time of completion National Steel and Shipbuilding Company was equally owned by Kaiser Industries Corporation and Morrison-Knudsen Company, Inc.

NASSCO also built the San Diego-class tankers at 180,000-dwt, Catalina-class tankers at 150,000- dwt and the Coronado-class tankers at 38,300-dwt. NASSCO also built for the US Navy Yellowstone-class destroyer tender (AD-41 class) at 19,800-ton each.

Two ships were converted by NASSCO to T-AH-19 hospital ships. The two hospital ships were delivered to the US Navy in 1986 and 1987 as Naval Auxiliary Fleet ships. The two provided for the Navy deployable acute medical care facility. Each has 1,000-bed medical care unit. They are used for armed forces and mercy missions to damaged locations, like after a typhoon.

Design 
Each ship is 894 feet long, with a beam of 105 feet and depths-draft of 64 feet. This is the maximum size, known as Panamax, that can pass through the Panama Canal. All the ships in the class have a double hull bottom for safety. They came with anti-collision radar, bacteria-enzyme sewage treatment plant and high-capacity clean ballast systems.

Owners
Aeron Marine Shipping Co.
Third Group, Inc.
Maritime Overseas Corp. (now Overseas Shipholding Group)
Chestnut Shipping Co.
United States Navy

Ships in class 
SS Beaver State, renamed Liberty Belle in 1988, scrapped 1995
SS American Heritage, Scrapped 1994
SS Golden Dolphin, launched on January 19, 1974, Explosion/sunk off Azores, 1982
SS Golden Endeavor, launched 1976,  Scrapped 1995
SS Aframax
SS Overseas New York, Scrapped 2004
SS Overseas Chicago, Scrapped 2004 
SS Overseas Ohio, renamed S/R Hinchinbrook in  2000, scrapped 2004 
SS Overseas Washington,  Scrapped 2006
SS Overseas Arctic  
SS Chestnut Hill, launched June 22, 1976. 
SS Kittaning, launched February 20, 1977.

Converted to hospital ships
  built as SS Worth in 1974, converted in 1984.
  built as SS Rose City, laid down in May 1975 converted in 1986.

References

External links

Ships built in San Diego
Oil tankers